Penal Code (Ordinance No. 2 of 1883) enacts the Criminal and Penal law of Sri Lanka. The Act/Law was adopted in 1883. There were two amendments carried out as Penal Code (Amendment) Act, No. 22 of 1993., Penal Code (Amendment) Act, No. 16 of 2006.

Structure 

The Penal Code has 22 Chapters and 490 Sections

References